Elephant Walk is a 1948 novel by Robert Standish, a pen name of the British writer Digby George Gerahty. It is set on a tea plantation in the British colony of Ceylon.

Film adaptation
It was the basis of the 1954 Hollywood film Elephant Walk directed by William Dieterle and starring Elizabeth Taylor and Dana Andrews and Peter Finch.

References

Bibliography
 Goble, Alan. The Complete Index to Literary Sources in Film. Walter de Gruyter, 1999.

1948 British novels
Novels set in Sri Lanka
British novels adapted into films
Peter Davies books